Mazdeh is a village in Howmeh Rural District, in the Central District of Khalilabad County, Razavi Khorasan Province, Iran. At the 2006 census, its population was 2,332, in 627 families.

References 

Populated places in Khalilabad County